Elections were held in the state of Western Australia on 8 April 1933 to elect all 50 members to the Legislative Assembly. The one-term Nationalist-Country coalition government, led by Premier Sir James Mitchell, was defeated by the Labor Party, led by Opposition Leader Philip Collier.

The election occurred at the height of the Great Depression, and was notable for four reasons. Firstly, it is, to date, the only Western Australian election at which a sitting Premier has been defeated in his own seat, with Sir James Mitchell losing his Northam seat to Albert Hawke. It has also been the only election (apart from the ministerial by-elections in December 1901) where over half a Ministry have been defeated at an election—apart from Mitchell, Hubert Parker, John Scaddan and John Lindsay all lost their parliamentary seats. Secondly, three future Premiers, Frank Wise (1943–1945), Albert Hawke (1953–1959) and John Tonkin (1971–1974), were elected to Parliament on the same day. Thirdly, it was held on the same day as the secession referendum, which was passed by 68% of voters despite their choice of a party to lead the State who had persistently opposed secession. Finally, the Nationalists fell to third place at the election in terms of seats, meaning that the Country Party, who had more seats in parliament, were able to name the Opposition Leader until Labor's eventual defeat in the 1947 election. This result was in part possible due to the malapportionment in the Western Australian parliament which created more seats in mining areas, where the Labor Party was dominant, and in agricultural areas, where the Country Party was dominant.

Two changes of affiliation had occurred in the previous term, which resulted in the Country Party increasing their parliamentary strength in the Assembly to 12 members. Arnold Piesse, who as an independent had defeated former Country Party leader Alec Thomson in his Katanning seat at the 1930 election, joined the Country Party, as did Richard Sampson, the long-serving member for Swan who had been elected a Nationalist.

Retiring members
 Edwin Corboy (Labor, Yilgarn-Coolgardie)
 Alfred Lamond (Labor, Pilbara)
 Henry Brown (Country, Pingelly)

At the time of the election, the seat of West Perth was vacant. Its previous member, former Attorney-General and Nationalist MLA Thomas Davy, died suddenly on 18 February 1933, aged 42, while playing bridge with his wife and two friends at the Savoy Hotel. He was succeeded at the election by Robert Ross McDonald, who went on to lead the Nationalist Party from 1938 and was instrumental in forming the Western Australian branch of the Liberal Party in 1945.

Results

At the election, 10 sitting members were defeated—nine Nationalists and one Country member. 8 of these seats were won by Labor, while Sussex was won by fellow Nationalist Edmund Brockman, and in Mount Marshall, Independent candidate Frederick Warner defeated Country member and Minister John Lindsay. (Warner went on to join the Country Party.) The only loss to Labor was the seat of Pilbara, which had been vacated by retiring member Alfred Lamond, and was won by the Nationalists' Frank Welsh.

|}

 237,197 electors were enrolled to vote at the election, but 9 of the 50 seats were uncontested—6 Labor seats representing 20,069 enrolled voters, 1 Nationalist seat representing 4,139 voters and 2 Country seats representing 7,677 voters.

See also
 Members of the Western Australian Legislative Assembly, 1930–1933
 Members of the Western Australian Legislative Assembly, 1933–1936
 Second Mitchell Ministry
 Second Collier Ministry

References

Elections in Western Australia
1933 elections in Australia
1930s in Western Australia
April 1933 events